Zenaida (Greek name meaning "Life of Zeus.") Zenaide (Italian), Zénaïde (French), or Zinaida.

It is a personal name used in many cultures used for women. It can also refer (as genus Zenaida) to the Zenaida doves, named after Princess Zénaïde Bonaparte.

As a personal name
Zenaida
Zenaida (saint), a traditional 1st century Christian saint.
Zenaida Beveraggi, "Zeny" of pop music duet Zeny & Zory
 Zenaida Manfugás, Cuban-born American pianist
Zenaida Moya, mayor of Belize City, Belize
Zenaida Yanowsky, Spanish ballet dancer

Zénaïde
Zénaïde Laetitia Julie Bonaparte, wife and cousin of ornithologist Charles Lucien Bonaparte
Zénaïde Rossi, stage name Irene Reni, Italian-French actress and singer

Zinaida
Zinaida Aksentyeva (1900–1969), Ukrainian/Soviet astronomer
Zinaida Amosova, Soviet cross-country skier
Zinaida Gippius, Russian poet
Zinaida Greceanîi, Moldovan politician
Zinaida Korotova, Russian rower
Zinaida Kupriyanovich, Belarusian singer
Zinaida Portnova, seventh-grade Soviet partisan and Hero of the Soviet Union
Zinaida Semenova, Russian long-distance runner
Zinaida Serebriakova, first notable female Russian painter
Zinaida Turchyna, Soviet handball player
Zinaida Volkova, daughter of Leon Trotsky
Zinaida Voronina, Soviet gymnast
Zinaida Yusupova, Russian noblewoman at the end of the Romanov dynasty

References

 
Slavic feminine given names
Russian feminine given names
Filipino feminine given names
Moldovan feminine given names
Greek feminine given names